Sarnowo  is a village in the administrative district of Gmina Lubraniec, within Włocławek County, Kuyavian-Pomeranian Voivodeship, in north-central Poland.

In the forest near the village is a group of 9 megalithic tombs which were built by people from Funnelbeaker Culture in 4000 years BC.

References

Sarnowo